Saad Ahmad (born 10 August 1989 in Syria) is a Syrian footballer. He plays as defender for football club Al-Fotuwa in Syrian Premier League.

References

External links
 
 
 

1989 births
Living people
Syrian footballers
Syria international footballers
Association football fullbacks
Al-Jazeera SC (Syria) players